Super Rock '85 in Japan was an overnight rock festival held on 10–11 August 1985 at Odaiba Kouen Hiroba in Tokyo, Japan. It was a sequel to Super Rock '84 in Japan. The show was headlined by Dio. Other performers included Foreigner, Sting, Mama's Boys, Rough Cutt and Earthshaker.

References

Heavy metal festivals in Japan